Cartsdyke railway station serves part of the town of Greenock, Scotland.

The station is situated between Bawhirley Road and McDougall Street and it serves passengers going to and from Gourock and Glasgow.

It is the nearest station to Cappielow, home of Greenock Morton F.C. Aside from the daily commuter traffic, some Saturday afternoons consequently are the busiest period of time for this station, which is only staffed for a few hours each day.

Services 

The service is hourly in each direction in the late evening & on Sundays.

References

External links 

Railway stations in Greenock
Former Caledonian Railway stations
Railway stations in Great Britain opened in 1841
SPT railway stations
Railway stations served by ScotRail